The SY Quest incident occurred in February 2011 when Somali pirates seized the American yacht SY Quest (s/v Quest) and four United States citizens. The United States Navy ordered the aircraft carrier USS Enterprise and three other ships to free the hostages. All four hostages were shot by their captors. 

The SY Quest was the first U.S. vessel captured by Somali pirates since the Maersk Alabama in 2009.

Incident
Pirates then tried sailing the SY Quest towards Puntland. Sometime thereafter the Enterprise, the guided missile cruiser USS Leyte Gulf and the guided missile destroyers USS Sterett and USS Bulkeley were sent to the area; they arrived several days later on or about 21 February. Captain Dee Mewbourne, of the Enterprise, opened negotiations with the pirates, at which time two Somalis went aboard the Sterett. As negotiations continued the following morning, 22 February, a pirate aboard the SY Quest fired a rocket-propelled grenade at the Sterett from 600 yards away but it missed. Almost immediately afterward, gunfire was heard aboard the yacht, so a boarding party was sent in on a raft and they boarded the SY Quest. In a brief skirmish that followed, two pirates were killed, one by rifle fire and the other by a combat knife. Thirteen pirates surrendered and were taken into custody. 

Navy officials said all four hostages were shot by their captors: Phyllis Macay and Robert Riggle, of Seattle, Washington, and the SY Quests owners, Jean and Scott Adam of Marina del Rey, California.

The bodies of two other pirates were also found aboard the SY Quest though United States Navy officials had no explanation for their deaths. A few days later, Vice Admiral Mark I. Fox, said the Americans had no intention of attacking but were obligated after hearing small-arms fire. 

The pirate leader Mohamud, in Somalia, claimed that the hostages were killed because the American warships started to attack and he told Reuters that "we ordered our comrades to kill the four Americans before they got killed." The leader Farah, in Bayla, Puntland, told Reuters, "I lost the money I invested and my comrades. No forgiveness for the Americans. Revenge. Our business will go on". He said he had spent $110,000 on food, weapons, and salaries for the hijacking. 

Thirteen of the pirates were found to be Somalis and the other a Yemeni; they were sent to Norfolk, Virginia to face charges of piracy and kidnapping.

Incarceration
On 8 July 2013 Ahmed Muse Salad, a/k/a "Afmagalo", 27, Abukar Osman Beyle, 33, and Shani Nurani Shiekh Abrar, 31–those who actually killed the 4 hostages–were found guilty of piracy, murder within the special maritime and territorial jurisdiction of the United States, violence against maritime navigation, conspiracy to commit violence against maritime navigation resulting in death, kidnapping resulting in death, conspiracy to commit kidnapping, hostage taking resulting in death, conspiracy to commit hostage taking resulting in death and multiple firearms offenses. All three were sentenced in November 2013 and all received 21 life sentences, 19 consecutive life sentences and 2 concurrent life sentences, and 30 years consecutive.

According to U.S. federal law, committing an act of piracy resulting in death has a mandatory life sentence.

14 men were prosecuted in the United States District Court for the Eastern District of Virginia for taking part in seizing of Quest. Federal prosecutors sought the death penalty for Ahmed Muse Salad, Abukar Osman Beyle, and Shani Nurani Abrar, however, they were sentenced to life in prison. Mohammed Saaili Shibin who acted as a negotiator between the pirates and U.S. forces was also sentenced to life imprisonment. All the defendants names, BOP Numbers, sentences and places of incarceration are listed below:

See also

List of ships attacked by Somali pirates in 2011

External links
 Welcome to s/v Quest Adventure Log (Archive)

References
10. "Hunter Killer". Novel by Lt-Col McCurley and Kevin Maurer

Conflicts in 2011
Quest
Piracy in Somalia
2011 in Somalia
Quest
Quest
February 2011 events in Africa